The High Court of Ireland is a court which deals at first instance with the most serious and important civil and criminal cases. The High Court is composed of its president, 42 ordinary judges, and additional judges being  the Chief Justice, the President of the Court of Appeal, the President of the Circuit Court, and former chief justices and courts presidents who remain judges.

Current members

Mícheál O’Higgins was nominated for appointment in January 2023.

Ex-officio members

Former members
  denotes presidents

See also
List of judges of the Supreme Court of Ireland
List of judges of the Court of Appeal of Ireland

References

External links
Courts Service of Ireland

 
High Court
 High Court